Martin Mason may refer to:

 Martin Mason (Quaker) (1650–1676), English Quaker
 Martin Mason (pioneer) (c. 1765–1812), surgeon, magistrate and commander and pioneer settler of Australia
 Martin Mason Hazeltine (1827–1903), American photographer